The Venezuelan bristle tyrant (Pogonotriccus venezuelanus) is a species of passerine bird in the family Tyrannidae. This species is sometimes placed in the genus Phylloscartes. It is endemic to Venezuela. Its natural habitat is subtropical or tropical moist montane forests. It is threatened by habitat loss.

References

Venezuelan bristle tyrant
Birds of the Venezuelan Coastal Range
Endemic birds of Venezuela
Venezuelan bristle tyrant
Taxonomy articles created by Polbot